HiphopLE is a Korean online music magazine which was founded in November 2010 by Heman. The magazine mostly focuses on "Urban music" such as hip-hop and R&B. Its goal is to improve the understanding and provide easier approach for Korean people to urban music. It provides worldwide news, subtitled music videos, editorials, interviews, and also hosts various events such as album sales and concerts.

The name "HiphopLE" stands for "Hiphop Limited Edition" and the slogan is "One Step Closer to Hiphop and R&B Music", which plays as an intro on the most of the video that LE presents. The voice is recorded by Kayla J.Yoo, the editor of HiphopLE.

History
Since 2009, Heman had been running his blog called "heQmentary", which provided up-to-date hip-hop & R&B news outside of Korea, and eventually, he came to a point where he wanted a well-organized website. After recruiting a few editorial writers and translators for the English lyrics, he designed and made the page to open the site in November 2010.

The site was initially known for its fast hip-hop news and its translated subtitled music videos, attracting many visitors. As the time went on, HiphopLE expanded its range of materials from only American and other foreign musics, to both foreign and Korean Hip-hop and R&B music. On top of that, they also continued to recruit more writers to upload various contents.

In 2013, HiphopLE opened a new section "Lifestyle" to cover additional cultural elements such as fashion, exhibition, art, etc. The variety of its contents was even furthered by beginning of its own radio broadcast ("The Art of Hip-Hop"), creation of the mobile phone application, video contents ("LE TV") and other off-line activities like HiphopLE Party, various campaigns & workshops, listening sessions, and book talk. Collaborations with other magazines or websites are also notable including contribution of articles to them.

In 2016, after going through renewal of web & mobile site format, the site commenced many of its projects; namely, launching of HiphopLE China, along with other fashion & culture brand production, book publishing, video directions and lectures.

Components

Teams
HiphopLE, in the aspect of an organization, consists of following subunits, or 'teams':

Executives - Plans and executes contents and offline projects
Magazines - Produces magazine contents
Media - Produces and/or translates various medias
Lifestyle - Produces and/or advertises culture contents
Interview - Plans and carries out artist interviews
Video - Plans, produces and/or advertises video materials.
Project - Plans, produces and/or advertises various "projects".

Website menus
HiphopLE features following menus:

News - News on worldwide urban music artists
Magazine - Album review, editorial, translated articles, etc.
Lifestyle - Features articles on fashion, concert reports, etc.
The LE - Exclusive LE-made materials such as subtitled music videos and special clips, lyric translations, "Black Lab" lectures, radio broadcasts
Special - Special pages regarding specific artists or events (music, movie, campaign, merchandise, etc.)
Community - Free board, Workroom (where members upload their own musics)

Characteristics
HiphopLE has its own unique ways of surging in the online music scene and one of them is by using social network like Twitter and Facebook to reach out to the visitors and to gather information. This allowed HiphopLE to engage in many discussions with the members of itself and to share their opinions about urban music culture.

The number of followers of social networks is reaching up to 160,000, while over 300 contents are updated monthly. The community section has also shown its activeness, with 2,600 posts and 15,000 replies in average written by its regular visitors.

The News is most recognized by the fact that it delivers up-to-date news, faster than any other Korean web magazines. Magazine corner provides many different articles, ranging from Hip-Hop to soul, funk, and other genres in urban music. Several editorials are uploaded to help listeners to have better understanding of urban music and to stimulate their interest for it. Subtitled music videos and special clips, one of the site's strengths, features various music videos, concert clips, documentaries, etc. subtitled in Korean. As of August 2012, HiphopLE made over 1000 subtitled movies, most of them American Hip-hop and R&B while some of them are Chinese and Japanese.

Notable contents

Book publishing
In June 2015 HiphopLE published the book titled American Hip hop. This book contained information on 2000s American hip hop, and was recorded the best selling book in pop culture category.

Listening sessions
HiphopLE has been carrying out listening sessions since 2015. Artists who have introduced their new albums through the sessions include JJK, P-type, Pento, Verbal Jint, and Owen Ovadoz.

LE Talk Concert
LE Talk Concert is directed by SoulfulMonster, the former member and editor in HiphopLE. It started in May 2012, with the first guest being MC Meta. The concert was intended to stage a talk show like those broadcast on TV, but with the guests from the hip hop scene and ask them funny and sometimes serious questions. As of August 2012, three concerts have been held, with more to come. It is currently sponsored by Korean Ministry of Culture, Sports, and Tourism, as part of "Pop Music Concert Project".

Merchandise
HiphopLE produces its own merchandise on a regular basis. Current items includes snapback caps and notebooks with its own design, and is preparing collaborations and collections with other brands.

Film screening
HiphopLE has taken its part in film screenings and advertisements such "The First Seoul Hip Hop Movie Festival" and screening of Nas: Time Is Illmatic. In the case of the Movie Festival the site has, with KU Cinematech, created and designed the contents like special feature pages, websites, etc.

Performance concerts and parties
Since 2013 HiphopLE hosts its own parties every November. Most recently the party in anniversary of the site's 5th year since opening had been concluded with featuring performance by uprising stars such as Loopy, Nafla, and DEAN.

Launching of HiphopLE China
In 2016 the site has launched "HiphopLE China", its own Chinese branch. It is currently servicing Chinese-translated hip hop news in Korean and Chinese hip hop industry. It is also preparing its own Weibo and Youku pages.

External links
Official homepage

References

South Korean music websites
Hip hop websites
Internet properties established in 2010